Levi Strauss Plaza, also known as Levi Plaza or Levi's Plaza, is an office complex located in North Beach/Telegraph Hill along The Embarcadero in San Francisco, California. It houses the headquarters of Levi Strauss & Co. As of 1998 the company Blue Jeans Equity West is the landlord of the complex. In 1998 the ownership of the company consisted of Equitable Real Estate, Gerson Bakar, Jim Joseph, and Al Wilsey. Steve Ginsberg of the San Francisco Business Times said in 1998 that the complex is "the only true corporate campus" in San Francisco.

History
The site was originally known as Frederick Griffing's wharf. Eventually, the land was built up and the wharf was buried along with Frederick Griffing's ship. When Levi's Plaza was under construction, the buried ship was rediscovered.

Levi Strauss Plaza was developed by Interland Development Corp., owned by Jim Joseph, the franchise owner of the Los Angeles football franchise of the United States Football League. Hellmuth, Obata and Kassabaum Inc. (HOK) designed the structure. Levi Strauss & Co. did the interior design, and Gensler and Associates supervised Levi Strauss's efforts.

Levi Strauss & Co. first moved to the facility in 1981.

Around 1995 arbitration proceedings between Levi Strauss and the owners occurred, due to negotiations over an increase in rent. Steve Ginsberg of the San Francisco Business Times said that some real estate insiders predicted that Levi Strauss may leave the complex due to the arbitration. The Levi Strauss company, in the 1990s, hired Staubach Co. so it could consider its headquarters options. Ginsberg said that despite the arbitration proceedings that previously took place, Levi Strauss "never seriously considered leaving" the City of San Francisco nor the Levi's Plaza complex.

In a two-year period until 1998 the company workforce had declined slightly to 1,700 employees. Ginsberg said that this was a reflection of a 1997 revenue slump.

In terms of the square footage, as of March 8, 1998 it was the largest lease deal in San Francisco of the 1990s. Because a decline in the company's workforce, the company reduced the amount of square footage that it held. Levi Strauss announced that it would invest several million additional dollars to renovate the complex, which at the time was 17 years old. The renovation work, scheduled to begin in 1999, was to affect all three major Levi's Plaza buildings, including the one housing the executive offices. Ginsberg said that the new "new, open look" design to be implemented in the renovations was to be "more conducive to team interaction."

In 2008 the San Francisco Business Times reported that Levi Strauss & Co. would consider moving the headquarters out of San Francisco once the lease in Levi's Plaza expired at the end of 2012. In 2009 the company renewed its lease through the end of 2022; the company had 1,200 employees at the facility at the time. In 2021 it renewed the lease yet again, for  square feet (of which one third was subleased by Levi's to other companies), and announced a $50 million project to make the offices carbon neutral.

Design
Levi Strauss & Co. provided significant input into the development of the facility. Bill Valentine, a designer at HOK, said "Someone at Levi's said they wanted it to feel like a well-worn pair of blue jeans. And that's what we tried to do -- it's off the cuff, never symmetrical, it's easy-going and relaxed." Levi Strauss wanted the new complex to promote mixing of all classes of employees. At its previous Embarcadero facility, the building forced upper level and lower level employees to be located on different floors, so the groups could not meet each other in common areas. A large atrium in one of the buildings is placed so that employees of all ranks receive the same view, and not just the higher up employees. Decks providing views of the surrounding city were used to integrate the inside and outside areas.

Keiko Yamagami of Gensler and Associates said that the designs, which she said were buildings within larger buildings, gives the corridor the atmosphere of "small street in a little town." Each campus building houses a "mini plaza." Yamagami said that each one is "sort of like the den in a home." Contrasting materials, such as rubber tile flooring, set off major circulation areas within the campus. Yamagami says that the flooring, which has a pattern, uses colors that "were almost like an impressionist painting." She emphasized that it had "West Coast sunset colors" The campus also houses an exercise room and various kitchenettes with different themes. Yamagami said in 1989 that the "garden den," with furniture styled like those used in outdoor settings, was among the most popular. The Levi Strauss cafeteria has   by  pavilion spaces, each of which have distinct colors and identities. Yamagami said that the company "didn't want to have an institutionalized cafeteria, they wanted to have a cafeteria that felt like a restaurant."

Levi's Plaza incorporated the Italian Swiss Colony Building into its design, and the complex was designed to fit into the surrounding neighborhood. In 1991 David Armstrong of The Toronto Star said that at Levi's Plaza, the then-new red brick buildings "blend in with historic warehouses." The building was designed to respect the residents of Telegraph Hill, which provided a backdrop to Levi's Plaza.

Buildings and facilities

Buildings at the Levi Plaza site include:
Saddleman Building (1355 Sansome Street), four floors,  of space
In 1998 Levi Strauss & Co. moved its employees out of Saddleman after seven women working there had developed breast cancer. The breast cancer cases appeared in 1996 and 1997, and a fear of cancer among the employees after an employee had a meeting with CEO Robert Haas. A study determined that the building did not pose a health hazard, but employees feared working in the building. In the summer of that year, employees began to be moved out. By October 1998, no employees were left.
The company originally stated that a downsizing had prompted to pull employees out of Saddleman. Several internal memorandums revealed that the fears of employees prompted the company to remove its employees from the building. At one time the consumer affairs, engineering groups, and pattern makers were located in the building.
Stern Building (1265 Battery Street) - Located on the campus's northeast corner
Koshland Building

The complex includes retail center that serves residents of the area and employees. Glenn Brank of the Sacramento Bee said that the retail center was "modest." As of 1987 Levi Strauss has a 450 person company cafeteria within the complex.

As of 1998, 66% of the space at Levi Plaza is dedicated to open plazas and park land. Levi Plaza Park is a facility at the complex. Liz Allen of the Public Library of Science said that the park is "a Zen oasis of willow trees, water, rocks and a meandering path in the busy city." Lawrence Halprin, a landscape architect, helped design the Levi Strauss Plaza. To coincide with the completion of the Levi Strauss Plaza, several of his design sketches were placed on exhibit. It is divided by Battery Street into two distinct parts. As of 1991 various community events were held at the park.

Levi's Plaza formerly had the Ice House, a  facility. In 1991 Levi Strauss & Co. acquired it. In 1998 the company planned to redesign the facility.

References

External links
 

Office buildings in San Francisco
Parks in San Francisco
North Beach, San Francisco
HOK (firm) buildings
Levi Strauss & Co.